Over the Top: Military March is a World War I era song released in 1917. Geoffrey O'Hara composed the music. The song was published by Chappell & Co., Ltd. of New York, New York. On the cover, there is a picture of Arthur Guy Empey, charging with a rifle. In the background, there are soldiers and barbed wire. It is written for piano.

The sheet music can be found at Pritzker Military Museum & Library.

References 

1917 songs 
Songs of World War I